María José Charro Galán, better known under her stage name La Terremoto de Alcorcón or La Terremoto, and also as Pepa Charro, is a Spanish singer born in Madrid, Spain.

She grew up in Alcorcón and studied languages. She went to the United Kingdom to work as an au pair. She has been a member of the group  Diabéticas Aceleradas since 1999. She lives in Majorca, where she owns a bar. She became well known in Spain for parodies of Madonna's Hung Up and Can't Get You Out of My Head and 2 Hearts, both by Kylie Minogue.

Recently she appeared as a regular feature of TVE2's late-night programme, presented by Cayetana Guillén Cuervo.

She has become a gay icon in Spain and has performed in New York City, London (at The Royal Vauxhall Tavern), and Mexico D.F. clubs. In 2007, she wrote and performed the track "Libérate", becoming the Official Europride Anthem (2007, Madrid). She performed in Lisbon during its "Arraial Gay Pride" in June 2009.

In 2019 she signed with Netflix to host the Spanish version of its reality series Nailed It!, which is titled Niquelao!. The first season of Niquelao! was released on October 25, 2019.

Discography 

Unless otherwise indicated, all these singles are parodies of the original artists:

 I Will Survive by Gloria Gaynor (titled Sin Afeitar) 
 A Quien Le Importa by Alaska
 It's Raining Men by Geri Halliwell
 Thriller by Michael Jackson
 Hung Up by Madonna
 Enajená (Let Me Out by Dover) 
 Crazy in Love by Beyoncé
 Can't Get You Out of My Head by Kylie Minogue
 Libérate - original song written and performed by Terremoto de Alcorcón for the Official Europride Anthemn, Madrid 2007 
 2 Hearts by Kylie Minogue
 He's My Man'' (Eurovision Song Contest 2008 - not chosen to be the Spanish contestant)

References

External links
www.laterremotodealcorcon.es

Living people
Singers from Madrid
Spanish women singers
Spanish vedettes
1977 births